Captain Narender Singh Ahlawat, SC, SM was an officer of the Indian Army. He was awarded the Sena Medal for his gallantry in the Battle of Shakargarh in the Indo-Pakistani War of 1971, posthumously awarded the Shaurya Chakra for his actions in counterinsurgency operations in Nagaland in 1974.

Early life
Narender Singh was born in Dighal village of Jhajjar district in Haryana to Major Ran Singh and Nehali Devi. His grandfather, Chaudhary Sohan Singh Ahlawat, a prominent name in the village and who fought with the British Indian Army in World War I. He had five brothers and two sisters. Two of his brothers, Lt. Colonel Ramphal and Colonel Mohinder Singh Ahlawat, served in the Indian army, and one, Nafe Singh Ahlawat, retired as a District and Sessions Judge, after serving in the Haryana judiciary. Another of his brothers Ved Singh Ahlawat served as the Deputy inspector general of police (DIG) in the Border Security Force, and his youngest brother, Sh Virender Singh, was an officer in the Delhi Police.

Education
Narender first attended King George School, and later graduated from DAV College, Chandigarh.

Military career
Following the tradition of the family, he joined the Indian army, and was commissioned into 15 The Grenadiers of the Indian Army as a second lieutenant. He rose to the rank of captain.

1971 Indo Pak War 

Immediately after becoming commissioned as a second lieutenant, he was deployed in the Indo-Pakistani War of 1971 and showed highest level of gallantry in the Battle of Shakargarh. For his bravery in the war he was awarded Sena Medal by Field Marshal Sam Manekshaw. 

His citation as published on 9 March 1974 in the official Gazette of India reads as under:

"83. Second Lieutenant NARENDER SINGH AHLAWAT (EC-25103)

The Grenadiers. On the 8th December 1971. Second Lieutenant Narender Singh Ahlawat was assigned the task of destroying a medium machine gun bunker in the Shakargarh Sector. He led his patrol with courage and captured the machine gun inflicting casualties on the enemy.

In the action, Second Lieutenant Narender Singh Ahlawat displayed leadership and devotion to duty."

1974 Nagaland Counter Insurgency

His Citation reads as:

"8. Captain NARENDER SINGH AHLAWAT (IC 25103), SM GRENADIERS

(Posthumous)

(Effective date of the award-28th November, 1974)

On the 28th November, 1974, during an operation against hostiles Captain Narender Singh Ahlawat of an infantry regiment, was assigned the task of establishing two stops, while the main column was conducting a search. Captain Ahlawat accomplished the task and took charge of one of the stops while the other was being looked after by a Non Commissioned Officer. The Non Commissioned Officer saw some hostiles at a distance of 300 yards from his stop, and ordered his Light Machine Gun group to open fire. This took the hostiles by surprise, who ran in disarray. Some of them ran towards the stop of Captain Ahlawat who immediately lifted his stop to intercept the hostiles. Some of the hostiles rushed into the nullah. Captain Ahlawat came face to face with two hostiles whom he made to surrender. In the meantime, another hostile fired from the nullah at one of his stop members. The officer immediately engaged that hostile but in the meanwhile he got a burst in his chest. Though seriously wounded, he continued to engage that hostile and kept on instructing his stops to chase the other fleeing hostiles. He simultaneously apprised the searching column commander of the situation and then lay dead.

In this action, Captain Narender Singh Ahlawat, displayed gallantry, devotion to duty and leadership of a High Order."

For his gallant act and supreme sacrifice he was posthumously awarded the Shaurya Chakra .

References

See also
 Insurgency in Northeast India
 Awards and decorations of the Indian Armed Forces

Indian Army personnel
1974 deaths
Jhajjar
People from Haryana
Recipients of the Shaurya Chakra
Recipients of the Sena Medal